The 1988 Football Championship of the Belarusian SSR was the 52nd regular annual competition in football of the Byelorussian Soviet Socialist Republic at all-republican level.

Overview
The championship consisted of two tiers: First (Pershaja) League and Trade Union competitions. Six teams were participating in the All-Union competitions and represented all the regional centers of Belarusian SSR: Dynama Mensk, Dynama Brest, Dnjapro Mahiljow, KIM Vitsebsk, Njoman Hrodna, Homselmash Homiel.

The First League was contested by 28 teams in two groups, and Abutnik Lida won the championship.

Pershaja Liha

Teams

Group stage

Group 1

Group 2

Play-off stage

|}

References
 RSSSF
 history of the USSR championships among KFK (tables) (История первенств CCCР среди КФК  (таблицы)). regional-football.ru

Football Championship of the Belarusian SSR
Football
Belarus